Raoul Esseboom (born 9 November 1992) is a Dutch footballer who plays for Tweede Divisie club VV Katwijk.

Club career
Esseboom joined Jong PSV Eindhoven in June 2011 as an 18-year-old from Haarlem based amateur side VV Young Boys, but left after one season for Eerste Divisie outfit FC Volendam. He made his professional debut for Volendam on 20 October 2013 against Jong FC Twente.

In summer 2017, Esseboom moved to Tweede Divisie club Katwijk.

References

1992 births
Living people
Footballers from Amsterdam
Association football midfielders
Dutch footballers
Jong PSV players
FC Volendam players
VV Katwijk players
Eerste Divisie players
Tweede Divisie players
Dutch sportspeople of Surinamese descent
HFC Haarlem players
SC Telstar players
HFC EDO players